Bell Canada (commonly referred to as Bell) is a Canadian telecommunications company headquartered at 1 Carrefour Alexander-Graham-Bell in the borough of Verdun in Montreal, Quebec, Canada. It is an ILEC (incumbent local exchange carrier) in the provinces of Ontario and Quebec; as such, it was a founding member of the Stentor Alliance. It is also a CLEC (competitive local exchange carrier) for enterprise customers in the western provinces.

Its subsidiary Bell Aliant provides services in the Atlantic provinces. It provides mobile service through its Bell Mobility (including flanker brand Virgin Mobile Canada) subsidiary, and television through its Bell Satellite TV (direct broadcast satellite) and Bell Fibe TV (IPTV) subsidiaries.

Bell Canada's principal competitors are Rogers Communications in Ontario, Telus and Shaw Communications in Western Canada, and Quebecor (Videotron) and Telus in Quebec. The company serves over 13 million phone lines and is headquartered at the Campus Bell complex in the borough of Verdun in Montreal.

Bell Canada is one of the main assets of the holding company BCE Inc., formerly known as Bell Canada Enterprises. In addition to the Bell Canada telecommunications properties, BCE also owns Bell Media (which operates mass media properties including the national CTV Television Network) and holds significant interests in the Montreal Canadiens ice hockey club and Maple Leaf Sports & Entertainment, owner of several Toronto professional sports franchises. BCE ranked number 301 on the 2021 edition of the Forbes Global 2000 list.

History
Historically, Bell Canada has been one of Canada's most important and most powerful companies and, in 1975, was listed as the fifth largest in the country. The company is named after the inventor of the telephone, Alexander Graham Bell, who also co-founded Bell Telephone Company in Boston, Massachusetts. Bell Canada operated as the Canadian subsidiary of the Bell System from 1880 to 1975. However, unlike the other regional Bell operating companies, Bell Canada had its own research and development labs.

Inception

In the mid-1870s Alexander Graham Bell, who was Scottish-born but lived in Canada, invented an analogue electromagnetic telecommunication device that could simultaneously transmit and receive human speech. In March 1876 he successfully patented his invention in the United States under the title of "Improvement In Telegraphy". His device later adopted the name now used worldwide, the telephone. Bell also patented it in Canada and transferred 75% of the Canadian patent rights to his father, Alexander Melville Bell, with the remaining 25% being awarded to Boston telephone manufacturer Charles Williams Jr. in exchange for 1,000 telephones to be provided to the Canadian market. This order could not be fulfilled due to surging demand in the United States.

For a few years, the senior Bell and his friend and business associate Reverend Thomas Philip Henderson collected royalties from the lease of telephones to customers in the limited late-1870s Canadian market, who either operated their own private telephone lines or subscribed to a third party telecommunications service provider.

In 1879 Bell's father sold his Canadian rights to the National Bell Telephone Company, formed in Boston, Massachusetts earlier that year by the merger of the Bell Telephone Company and the New England Telephone and Telegraph Company, which in 1880 reorganized as the American Bell Telephone Company, initiating the Bell System. That same year the Canadian division was renamed to "The Bell Telephone Company of Canada Ltd.", eventually to be headed by U.S. executive Charles Fleetford Sise from Chicago who served as its first general manager.

The first supplier of telephones to Bell was a company established by Thomas C. Cowherd and his son James H. Cowherd, in a three-storey brick building in Brantford, Ontario, creating Canada's first telephone factory. Thomas and James had been good friends of Alexander Graham Bell, providing stovepipe wire with which Bell conducted his early telephone experiments from his father's home in Tutelo Heights, Ontario, and also building some 2,398 telephones to Bell's specifications for the Canadian market until James Cowherd's untimely death from tuberculosis in 1881. With a government-granted monopoly on Canadian long-distance telephone service, The Bell Telephone Company of Canada was serving 237,000 subscribers by 1914.

Since its early years The Bell Telephone Company of Canada, Ltd. had been known colloquially as "The Bell" or "Bell Telephone". On March 7, 1968, Canadian federal legislation renamed The Bell Telephone Company of Canada, Ltd. to Bell Canada.

Competition and territory reduction

Bell Canada extended lines from Nova Scotia to the foot of the Rocky Mountains in what is now Alberta. However, most of the attention given to meeting demand for service focused on major cities in Ontario, Quebec, and the Maritime Provinces.

Atlantic Canada
During the late 19th century, Bell sold its Atlantic operations in the three Maritime provinces, where many small independent companies also operated and eventually came under the ownership of three provincial companies. Newfoundland and Labrador joined Canada with several private companies, and a government operation that was transferred to the control of Canadian National Railways.

Bell acquired interests in all Atlantic companies during the early 1960s, starting with Newfoundland Telephone (which later was organized as NewTel Communications) on July 24, 1962. Bell acquired controlling interest in Maritime Telephone and Telegraph Company, later known as MT&T, which also owned PEI-based Island Telephone, and in Bruncorp, the parent company of NBTel in 1966. The purchase of MT&T was made despite efforts of the Nova Scotia legislature on September 10, 1966, to limit the voting power of any shareholder to 1000 votes. Bell-owned MT&T absorbed some 120 independent companies, most serving fewer than 50 customers each. Bell-owned NewTel purchased the CNR-owned Terra Nova Tel in 1988.

In the late 1990s, Newtel, Bruncorp, MT&T and Island Tel merged into Aliant, now Bell Aliant which owns many services in rural areas of Ontario and Quebec formerly owned by Bell Canada.

On January 1, 2011, Bell acquired xwave from Bell Aliant for $40 million, an information technology company offering sales and services in Atlantic Canada.

Quebec and Ontario

Independent companies appeared in many areas of Ontario, Quebec and Maritime provinces without adequate Bell Canada service. During the 20th century Bell acquired most of the independent companies in Ontario and Quebec, most notably the purchase of Nexxlink Technologies, a Montreal-based integrated IT solutions and telecommunications provider founded by Karol Brassard. Alongside the acquisition of Charon Systems, Nexxlink now operates today as Bell Business Solutions—a division of Bell Canada. Quebec, however, still has large swaths of relatively rural areas served by Telus Québec (formerly Québec Telephone, later acquired by Telus) and Télébec (now owned by Bell Canada via Bell Aliant) and by some 20 small independent companies. As of 1980, Ontario still had some 30 independent companies, and Bell has not acquired any; the smaller ones were sold to larger independents with larger capital resources. Cellcom Communications is the largest franchisee of Bell Canada, currently operating 25 Bell stores in both Québec and Ontario regions.

Alberta, Manitoba and Saskatchewan 
At separate times, the three Prairie provinces acquired Bell Canada operations and formed provincial utility services, investing to develop proper telephone services throughout those provinces; Bell Canada's investment in the prairies had been scant or insufficient relative to growth, and all three had various local telephone companies. The Alberta government's Alberta Government Telephones Commission and Manitoba Government Telephones purchased the Bell operations of their provinces in 1908. Saskatchewan's Department of Railways, Telegraphs and Telephones, established in June 1908, purchased the Bell operations on October 1, 1909; all three provinces' government operations eventually acquired the independent companies.

Having achieved a high level of development, Manitoba moved to privatize its telephone utility and Alberta privatized Alberta Government Telephones to create Telus in the 1990s. Saskatchewan continues to own SaskTel as a crown corporation. Edmonton was served by a city-owned utility, Edmonton Telephones Corporation, that was sold to Telus in 1995. BCE re-gained ownership of the Manitoba system, now known as Bell MTS, on March 17, 2017.

British Columbia 
British Columbia, served today by Telus, was served by numerous small companies that mostly amalgamated to form British Columbia Telephone, later known as BC Tel (the last known acquisition was the Okanagan Telephone Company in the late 1970s), which served the province from the 1960s until its merger with Telus. (The amalgamations produced one anomaly: Atlin is surrounded by the territory of Northwestel, implying that the company that established service there was acquired by a company serving territories further south.)

Northern Canada 
Although Bell Canada entered the Northwest Territories (NWT) with an exchange at Iqaluit (then known as Frobisher Bay, in the territory now known as Nunavut) in 1958, Canadian National Telecommunications, a subsidiary of Canadian National Railways (CNR), provided most of the telephone service in Canada's northern territories (specifically, Yukon, northern BC and the western NWT). CNR created Northwestel in 1979, and Bell Canada Enterprises acquired the company in 1988 as a wholly owned subsidiary. Bell Canada sold its 22 exchanges in the eastern region of the NWT to Northwestel in 1992, and BCE transferred ownership of the company to Bell Canada in 1999. Northwestel's operating area was in 2001 opened to long-distance competition (which has materialized only in the form of prepaid card business, and service to large national customers with some operating locations in the north) and in 2007 to resale of local telephone service (which has not yet occurred).

Northern British Columbia, northeastern Ontario and the James Bay region of northern Quebec were served by independent companies, though Bell Canada eventually provided service in more far-flung reaches of Ontario and Quebec, acquired ownership interests in companies serving large swaths of northwestern Quebec and northeastern Ontario, and in Northwestel.

Divestiture and deregulation
The Bell System had two main companies in the telephone industry in Canada: Bell Canada as a regional operating company (affiliated with AT&T, with an ownership stake of approximately 39%) and Northern Electric as an equipment manufacturer (affiliated with Western Electric, with an ownership stake of approximately 44%). The Bell Telephone Company of Canada and Northern Electric were structured similarly in Canada to the analogous portions of the Bell System in the United States; the regional operating company (Bell Canada) sold telephone services as a local exchange carrier, and Western Electric (Northern Electric) designed and manufactured telephone equipment.

As part of the consent decree signed in 1956 to resolve the antitrust lawsuit filed in 1949 by the United States Department of Justice, AT&T and the Bell System proper divested itself of Northern Electric in 1956.

In October 1973, AT&T and Bell Canada signed an agreement stating that AT&T would no longer furnish Bell System communications and research to Bell Canada. AT&T's at-the-time chairman John DeButts explained that the main reason for this was because Bell Canada had developed its own research and development lab (Bell-Northern Research), making Bell Canada ready to serve its Canadian landline customers on its own. As a result, AT&T divested Bell Canada on June 30, 1975.

Even though Bell Canada had been divested, it was allowed to participate in Bell System projects which could be completed shortly after its divestiture date.

Northern Electric renamed itself Northern Telecom in 1976, which in turn became Nortel Networks in 1998 with the acquisition of Bay Networks.

Bell Canada acquired 100 percent of Northern Electric in 1964; starting in 1973, Bell's ownership stake in Northern Electric was diminished through public stock offerings, though it retained majority control. In 1983, as a result of deregulation, Bell Canada Enterprises (later shortened to BCE) was formed as the parent company to Bell Canada and Northern Telecom. As a result of the stock transaction used by Northern Telecom to purchase Bay Networks, BCE ceased to be the majority owner of Nortel, and in 2000, BCE spun out its share of Nortel, distributing its holdings to its shareholders.

Between 1980 and 1997, the federal government fully deregulated the telecommunications industry and Bell Canada's monopoly largely ended. Bell Canada currently provides local phone service only in major city centres in Ontario and Quebec.

In July 2006, Bell and former subsidiary Aliant completed a restructuring whereby Aliant, renamed Bell Aliant Regional Communications, took over Bell's wireline operations in much of Ontario and Quebec (while continuing to use the "Bell" name in those regions), as well as its 63% ownership in rural lines operator Bell Nordiq (a publicly traded income trust that controls NorthernTel and Télébec). These are in addition to Bell Aliant's operations in Atlantic Canada. In turn, Bell has assumed responsibility for Bell Aliant's wireless and retail operations. Bell Aliant, now an income trust, is 44% owned by Bell.

On April 30, 2007, the Canadian Radio-television and Telecommunications Commission (CRTC) announced its decision to allow pay phone rates for Bell Canada, Telus, Bell Aliant, SaskTel, and MTS Allstream to increase from 25 cents to 50 cents, starting as early as June 1. The CRTC also permitted local rural rates to increase by the lesser of the annual rate of inflation or five percent, and removed price caps on optional rural services, such as call display and voicemail.
On June 2, 2007, Bell Canada increased the cost of a local pay phone call to 50 cents when paid in cash and one dollar when paid by calling card or credit card,
Bell's first increase in pay phone rates since 1981.

In 2009, Bell Canada purchased electronics retailer The Source and all other assets of InterTAN Canada Ltd. from bankrupt Circuit City.

Bell has deployed MPLS on their nationwide fibre ring network to support consumer and enterprise-level IP applications, such as IPTV and VoIP.

On March 17, 2017, BCE Inc. completed its acquisition of Manitoba Telecom Services.

Criticism 
Bell Canada has faced controversy and scandal. In late 2011, Bell Canada admitted to a policy of bandwidth throttling of BitTorrent traffic across its network when it announced it would stop the practice of "traffic shaping" during periods of high demand beginning in March 2012. In November 2011, only a few weeks before, the CRTC issued a ruling that stopped the controversial practice of usage-based billing of smaller internet service providers who purchase space on Bell Canada networks, providing a fee structure based on total capacity needed. Bell Canada had originally wanted to charge providers by how much data each user downloaded.

In May 2017, the email addresses of 1.9 million Bell customers were stolen, along with the name and phone numbers of 1.7 million customers. Then in January 2018, there was another data breach affecting about 100 thousand Bell customers.

Bell Canada's mobile phone services has been criticized for monopolistic practices, including during its acquisition of MTS.

Services 

Bell Canada provides many different types of telecommunications services.

Voice
Bell Canada provides standard voice service. It used to offer VoIP to customers, branded as "Digital Voice". Businesses can still obtain VoIP service. It now offers  BTC (Bell Total Connect) SIP service as a digital voice package.

Voicemail
Bell Home Phone and Bell Mobility provide voicemail service as an optional feature for residences and businesses. Bell Prepaid customers, however, receive a basic voice mail at no additional charge. The complimentary voice mail can store five messages of one minute each, for up to five days.

Wireless

Bell Mobility operates a cellular network in all Canadian provinces. It also owns Virgin Mobile Canada . While it created the Solo Mobile brand in 1999, Bell shut down all standalone Solo stores in 2011 while discontinuing third-party sales of all Solo phones in November 2011. The brand continues to be active for its current customers, but there are no incentives to encourage new subscriptions.

Television 

Formerly known as ExpressVu, Bell Satellite TV is a satellite television service provider. There is also a mobile TV service, Bell Mobile TV, and an locked IPTV service known as Bell Fibe TV and Alt TV. The latter is available in most of Alberta, British Columbia, the Greater Toronto Area, Ottawa, Montreal, Québec City and Atlantic Canada.

Internet 
Bell Internet provides high speed DSL and fiber to the home FTTH Internet service in many areas where it offers phone service. DSL is offered in various speeds ranging from 500 kbit/s to 100 Mbit/s download and 256 kbit/s to 10 Mbit/s upload on DSL while up to 8 Gbit/s on fiber optic depending on what the local infrastructure can support.

Bell began offering Fibre-to-the-node Internet access to some subscribers in 2010. Bell markets this service under the name "Fibe". Many urban Fibe regions can access all speeds up to and including 50+mbps down and 15+mbps up but some rural Fibe regions can only obtain 16 Mbit/s down and 1 Mbit/s up. Non-Fibe regions are limited to legacy DSL technology, supporting speeds of up to 7 Mbit/s down and 1 Mbit/s up. Bell Canada has now rolled out Fibre to the Home services to certain subscribers across Eastern Canada, this service can provide guaranteed download of 3 Gbit/s and upload speeds of 3 Gbit/s. In August 2019, the company announced it would cut roughly 200,000 households from a rural internet expansion program after a federal regulator lowered wholesale broadband prices that major telecom companies can charge smaller internet providers.

In a press release issued February 24, 2022, Bell announced that it has acquired Internet service provider EBOX. Bell wishes to keep the brand and the activities of EBOX and let the company continue to operate independently while remaining based in Longueuil.

Legacy 
Bell previously offered Bell Home Monitoring, also known as Bell Gardium.

Bell Canada also previously offered cable television services in the United Kingdom via Bell Cablemedia plc (a joint venture with Jones Intercable and Cable & Wireless plc) from 1994 until 1997, when Vidéotron first sold its UK operations to Bell Cablemedia, after which Bell Cablemedia and the UK operations of NYNEX Corporation merged with Cable & Wireless plc to form Cable & Wireless Communications.

Marketing 
Bell Canada created the Frank and Gordon beavers to advertise its products from 2006 to 2008.

Coinciding with its advertising campaign as part of its sponsorship of the 2008 Beijing Olympics, Bell introduced a new logo and minimalist ad style, with the slogans "Today just got better" (with emphasis on the suffix "er") in English Canada and "La vie est Bell" (a pun on "La vie est Belle" — ) in French Canada. The font used in Bell's marketing is a custom typeface known as 'Bell Slim', by Canadian typeface designer Ian Brignell.

Historical financial performance 
The financial performance of the company is reported to shareholders on an annual basis. The unit (except where noted) is millions of Canadian dollars.

See also 

 American Telephone & Telegraph, AT&T, an earlier parent and successor to American Bell
 Bell Centre, a hockey arena in Montreal
 Bell Mobility, the division of Bell Canada which sells wireless services in Canada
 Bell System, the Bell Telephone / AT&T-led companies which provided phone services
 Bell Telephone Memorial, a large monument honouring the inventor in Brantford, Ontario
 Bell Tower, an office tower in Edmonton
 International Bell Telephone Company, the Bell Telephone's early European division
 National Bell Telephone Company, the very earliest parent company
  Place Bell, an office tower in Ottawa
 Telephone Pavilion (Expo 67), also known as the Bell Telephone Pavilion
 Thomas Cowherd, who helped establish Canada's first telephone factory
 List of public corporations by market capitalization
 List of largest companies by revenue
 List of telephone operating companies
 List of United States telephone companies

References 

 Footnotes 

 Citations

External links 

 Official website
 BCE Inc. website
 Bell Telephone Company of Canada –  public historical documents
 CRTC chart of Bell Canada's assets
 Bell Canada pixel art ad campaign
 Bell Telephone Company of Canada (from Bell System Memorial)
 Operator. May I help you?: Bell Canada's 125 Years – Bell Canada's origins (illustrated with many early photographs)

 
1880 establishments in Quebec
Bell System
Canadian brands
Companies based in Montreal
Verdun, Quebec
Corporate spin-offs
Information technology companies of Canada
Internet service providers of Canada
Telecommunications companies established in 1880
Telecommunications companies of Canada